Amarendra Khatua (born 4 June 1957) is an Indian civil servant who belongs to the Indian Foreign Service cadre. He is the former High Commissioner of India to Argentina, Ivory Coast, Former Secretary (Special Assignment) at Ministry of External Affairs (India)  and former Director General of the Indian Council for Cultural Relations, an autonomous organisation of the Government of India.

Personal life
Amarendra Khatua spent his childhood in Birupa Village of Odisha. He obtained a graduate degree from Kirori Mal College University of Delhi in 1978.

Career
He joined the Indian Foreign Service in 1981. He served as special envoy at South Sudan and Sudan to broker peace between two countries. He served as Dean of Sushma Swaraj Institute of Foreign Service and implemented many changes in working. He served as Indian Ambassador to Argentina, Ivory Coast as well. He is also a popular poet in his native language, Odia.

References

Living people
Indian Foreign Service officers
Ambassadors of India to Argentina
Delhi University alumni
1957 births